is a visual novel produced and published by Chunsoft. Marketed by the company as a "sound novel" rather than a video game, it is the progenitor of the developer and publisher's sound novel series and of the format of electronic entertainment now usually known generically as a visual novel. Koichi Nakamura conceived the title after showing his work on the Dragon Quest role-playing video games to a girl he was dating. On finding she did not enjoy them, he was encouraged to make a video game that he described as "for people who haven't played games before." Influenced by the early survival horror game Sweet Home, he developed it into a horror-themed interactive story. The game sold over 400,000 copies in Japan, including over 300,000 copies for Super Famicom and 100,000 for PlayStation. It was later adapted into the film St. John's Wort. A sequel,  Kirigirisō, was released in 2016, produced by Spike Chunsoft and serving as a crossover with and prequel to the Danganronpa series.

Plot
Two passengers survive the car accident and arrive at the mansion. Nobody answer the doorbell and they kick in the door. They cannot find anyone in the house, but hear things lurking in the shadows.

Production
The game was developed at the same time as  Dragon Quest V. Koichi Nakamura had previously been involved with the development of the previous Dragon Quest games, specifically Dragon Quest, Dragon Quest II and Dragon Quest III, and recalled that he was dating a girl at the time who did not play video games. Although she tried playing the games that Nakamura had helped develop, she expressed that she did not really understand the games or what was supposed to be fun about them. This led to Nakamura thinking he should make a game that he described as "for people who haven't played games before." He thought of older text adventures but even felt those were a bit complicated. This led to Nakamura making a game that would be simplified even further by "having it be decision-based, where you're just reading the story and it will come to a branching point where it'll give you a choice: the character does A, B, or C. It's very simple, but it also gives the player some level of interaction with the game. I figured something very simple like this would be something anybody could pick up, and maybe it would also lead them to playing other games in the future."

In contrast to the lighter comical action games and fantasy games at the time, Nakamura had worked on previously, the game was set in the real world and made in the horror genre. Nakamura described the influence of developing a horror themed game at the time lied in the video game Sweet Home, saying: "there weren’t any real horror games. But right around the time I was thinking of making Otogirisō, Capcom created Sweet Home. The thing that was really interesting about Sweet Home was that it so scary that you didn't want to continue playing. I wanted to create an experience where the user would be too afraid to press the button to continue the story, too."

Release and reception
The game was released for Super Famicom in March 1992 and was described as selling "quite high" in Japan by Rik Haynes of Super Play. It went on to sell over 400,000 copies in Japan, including over 300,000 copies for the Super Famicom and about 100,000 for the PlayStation.

Famitsu scored the PlayStation version a 30 out of 40.  In an article on Japanese games in Nintendo Power, an anonymous writer commented that "to American gamers who have made fast-action games the biggest sellers, the concept of a video mystery novel would seem quite foreign. The experienced Japanese players we talked to thought it was an interesting change and commented that the great sound made the game." Jeremy Parish of Polygon discussed the game in 2018, stating that it "could perhaps be written off as little more than a digital version of the old Choose Your Own Adventure books of the '80s. However, the mature writing combined with the eerie atmosphere created by the graphics and music set the game apart from anything that had come before."

The game was released on the Wii Virtual Console on August 28, 2007.

Legacy

Crossover sequel

Kirigirisō was announced and shown in the October 2016 issue of Famitsu by Spike Chunsoft, as a "sound novel" for personal computer systems Windows and OS X. The game was developed by Danganronpa Kirigiri author Takekuni Kitayama on request of Spike Chunsoft, as a crossover sequel to Otogirisō and prequel to Danganronpa: Trigger Happy Havoc, featuring elements from the Danganronpa series.

Film adaptation

A film adaption of the game was released in Japan on January 27, 2001. It was released in both an English dub and subtitled edition by Asylum Home Entertainment on March 23, 2004.

References

Sources

External links
 Chunsoft
 

1992 video games
Bishōjo games
Chunsoft games
1990s horror video games
Japan-exclusive video games
Kadokawa Dwango franchises
Mystery video games
PlayStation (console) games
PlayStation Network games
Super Nintendo Entertainment System games
Video games developed in Japan
Virtual Console games for Wii U
Visual novels
Single-player video games